SEEUTechPark is a technology park located on South East European University campus in Tetovo, North Macedonia. Opened on May 15, 2013 by the Board of South East European University in order to create conditions to stimulate the creation of new start-up companies, creating a synergy between the companies and encourage the growth of existing SMEs (small and medium enterprises) which in the long term provides new job opportunities.

History
SEEUTechPark launched on February 1, 2013.

Tenants Department
SEEUTechPark

Incubator Department
SEEUTechPark

Training and Events Department
SEEUTechPark

Microsoft IT Academy
Trainings not only on fundamentals technology but also technical courses for students and others that are interested to be successful during their studies and at beginning of their career.

Wednesday TALK!
Panel discussion organized by the SEEUTechPark which comes with a meeting in a month                                                                                                              - “On  Wednesday“

Wednesday TALK! is designed to provide an opportunity for students and everyone who wants to hear several people knowledgeable about specific issue or topic, present information and discuss personal views. Wednesday TALK! may help the audience further clarify and evaluate their positions regarding specific issues or topics being discussed and increase their understanding of the positions of others.

References

Farrington, D J (2006) SEEU –The First Four Years (SEEU, Tetovo, North Macedonia)
Farrington, D J (2006) SEEU Tetovo -From political challenge to academic success (Forum 2010, Kosovo)
Abazi, A and Farrington D J (2009)    Organization and management of non-profit private higher education in a
multi-ethnic, multi-lingual environment (with A Abazi) US-China Journal of Education (10)

Farrington D J (ed) (2010)	From Greenfields to Intelligent Buildings – Ten Years of the SEEU Project(SEEU, Tetovo, North Macedonia)
Farrington D J and Ismaili D (2011)   Finding the right person to lead a third generation university: a new
approach in North Macedonia in Procedia Social and Behavioural Sciences 15, 2093-2087

Fetaji, B., Helic, D. & Maurer, H. (2005).   E-Learning Strategy for South East European University to Enable Borderless Education. In G. Richards (Ed.), Proceedings of World Conference on E-Learning in Corporate, Government, Healthcare, and Higher Education 2005 (pp. 2557–2569). Chesapeake, VA: AACE.

Science parks in North Macedonia